The 18th Luftwaffe Field Division was an infantry division of the Luftwaffe branch of Nazi Germany's Wehrmacht during the Second World War. It was set up on 1 December 1942 from surplus Luftwaffe personnel and was deployed in France from February 1943 to September 1943. On September 20, 1943, the division was transferred to the army and renamed Field Division 18 (L).

See also
 Luftwaffe Field Divisions

References

Luftwaffe Field Divisions
1943 establishments in Germany
1943 disestablishments in Germany
Military units and formations established in 1943
Military units and formations disestablished in 1943